The Truth, Reconciliation and Reparations Commission (TRRC) is a truth commission in The Gambia to investigate the Yahya Jammeh era from 1994 to 2017. The process from the announcement of the commission to its launch lasted from 20 July 2017 to 15 October 2018. Its executive secretary is Baba Galleh Jallow, its lead counsel is Essa M. Faal, and the chairperson of the 11-strong commission is Lamin J. Sise.

History

Establishment 
The process for founding the TRRC was led by the Attorney General, Ba Tambadou. At a press conference on 20 July 2017, Tambadou announced that a draft bill for the establishment of the TRRC had been shared with international experts for review. He also announced that a team, led by himself, would begin a public engagement tour on the bill in August, which lasted from 14 to 24 August. Tambadou then proceeded to table the bill before the National Assembly. On 13 December 2017, the Truth, Reconciliation and Reparations Commission (TRC) Act was passed, and it received presidential assent on 13 January 2018.

Barrow appointed academic Baba Galleh Jallow as Executive Secretary of the TRRC with effect from 1 February 2018. Also in February, a call was made for nominations to the TRRC. The job description specified that individuals should be of "high moral character and integrity," "no criminal record or involvement in past human rights violations," no political party activity, and residency in either the Greater Banjul Area or in the diaspora. In August 2018, Jallow appointed Alagie Barrow as the director of research and investigation for the commission. It was announced that the commission would begin proceedings on 15 October 2018. On 5 October, Abdoulie Janneh, who had previously been announced as the chairperson of the commissioners, stepped down from the role due to scheduling conflicts. Lamin J. Sise, a close confidante of the late UN Secretary-General Kofi Annan, was announced to replace him.

Launch 
The commission was launched at Dunes Resort Hotel, Kotu Beach, Kololi, on 15 October. It was launched by President Adama Barrow and attended by senior figures including Mariam Jack-Denton, the Speaker of the National Assembly, Hassan Bubacar Jallow, the Chief Justice, and members of the diplomatic corps, the National Assembly, civil society, and international organisations. Barrow noted that the TRRC would be independent, and was the sixth truth commission launched in Africa in its history. Other speakers included Ba Tambadou, the Attorney General, Sherif Kijera of The Gambia Centre for Victims of Human Rights Violations, Fatou Bensouda, the current chief prosecutor of the International Criminal Court, Mohamed Ibn Chambas, the UN Secretary-General's special representative for West Africa, and Miguel de Serpa Soares, the UN Under-Secretary-General for Legal Affairs. Baba Galleh Jallow delivered the vote of thanks.

Staff and commissioners

Staff 
A number of job posting were advertised, starting in June 2018, at the commission. Five research assistants, nine investigators, and 20 statement takers were advertised for. A number of coordinator roles were also advertised for, including in victim support, community outreach, youth and children, and women's affairs.

Commissioners 
This is the list of designated commissioners released to the media in August 2018, they are not yet confirmed.

References 

Reconciliation
Truth and reconciliation commissions
2018 in the Gambia
2018 establishments in Africa